Mehmet Yılmaz (born 9 April 1974) is a Turkish male weightlifter, competing in the 77 kg category and representing Turkey at international competitions. He participated at the 1996 Summer Olympics in the 76 kg event and at the 2000 Summer Olympics in the 77 kg event. He competed at world championships, most recently at the 2003 World Weightlifting Championships.

Major results
  2002 European Championships Middleweight class (360.0 kg)
  2004 European Championships Middleweight class (360.0 kg).

References

External links
 

1974 births
Living people
Turkish male weightlifters
Weightlifters at the 1996 Summer Olympics
Weightlifters at the 2000 Summer Olympics
Olympic weightlifters of Turkey
Place of birth missing (living people)
World Weightlifting Championships medalists
Mediterranean Games gold medalists for Turkey
Mediterranean Games medalists in weightlifting
Competitors at the 2001 Mediterranean Games
20th-century Turkish people
21st-century Turkish people